Like You to Meet was an Australian television series which aired 1959 on Melbourne station HSV-7, on Wednesdays from 29 July 1959 to 14 October 1959. It was an interview series with Geoff Raymond. The 15-minute series aired at 4:15PM, on a daytime schedule which also included shows like Let's Make Clothes and The Jean Bowring Show.

References

External links
Like You to Meet at IMDb

Seven Network original programming
1959 Australian television series debuts
1959 Australian television series endings
Australian television talk shows
Black-and-white Australian television shows
English-language television shows